St Thomas Catholic Church Arunoottimangalam is a Parish church in the Palai Eparchy in Kottayam district of Kerala. The church is also called in Malayalam as Malakayatta palli meaning church with the hill climbing way. The parishioners in the past belonged to Kaduthuruthy church and Reverend Father Mathai kathanar Chempalayil started way of cross ceremony on the hill located behind the current church. Eventually the church was built at this place.

Way of cross has been conducted since 1920 on every 40th day i.e Friday of the Roman Catholic Lent season which is 50 days. A Holy Relic from the Cross of Passion of Christ was brought to this church from Rome and since then devotees has been granted innumerable favours. The belief is that no prayer request made here goes unanswered. This is evident seeing the number of pilgrims visiting and praying in this church.

Every year Thursday and Friday before the Good Friday of the Holy week is celebrated here pompously with mass and way of cross prayers throughout these 2 days.

See also
Roman Catholicism in India

References

Roman Catholic churches in Kerala
Churches in Kottayam district